The 2022 Davis Cup World Group I Play-offs were held on 4–6 March 2022. The twelve winners of this round qualified for the 2022 Davis Cup World Group I while the twelve losers qualified for the 2022 Davis Cup World Group II.

Teams
Twenty-four teams played for twelve spots in the World Group I, in series decided on a home and away basis.

These twenty-four teams are:
 2 losing teams from World Group I Knock-out ties.
 12 losing teams from World Group I.
 8 winning teams from World Group II.
 2 winning teams from World Group II Knock-out ties.

The 12 winning teams from the play-offs would play at the World Group I and the 12 losing teams would play at the World Group II.

#: Nations Ranking as of 20 September 2021.

Qualified teams

  (#21)
  (#22)
  (#25)
  (#28)
  (#29)
  (#31)
  (#33)
  (#34)
  (#35)
  (#36)
  (#37)
  (#38)

  (#39)
  (#40)
  (#43)
  (#45)
  (#46)
  (#47)
  (#49)
  (#51)
  (#52)
  (#54)
  (#56)
  (#57)

Results summary

World Group I Play-offs results

Chile vs. Slovenia

India vs. Denmark

Uzbekistan vs. Turkey

Portugal vs. Poland

Tunisia vs. Bosnia and Herzegovina

Israel vs. South Africa

New Zealand vs. Uruguay

Ukraine vs. Barbados

Pakistan vs. Lithuania

Peru vs. Bolivia

Switzerland vs. Lebanon

Mexico vs. Belarus

References

External links

World Group
Davis Cup
Davis Cup
Davis Cup
Davis Cup
Davis Cup